Miroslav Viazanko (born 27 October 1981) is retired Slovak football winger.

Career statistics

External links
 
 MFK Košice profile

1981 births
Living people
Sportspeople from Prešov
Association football wingers
Slovak footballers
1. FC Tatran Prešov players
FC VSS Košice players
FK Železiarne Podbrezová players
Slovak Super Liga players
2. Liga (Slovakia) players